Minglanilla, officially the Municipality of Minglanilla,  is a 1st class municipality in the province of Cebu, Philippines. According to the 2020 census, it has a population of 151,002 people.

Minglanilla is bordered to the north by the City of Talisay, to the west is the city of Toledo, to the east is the Cebu Strait, and to the south is the city of Naga.

Minglanilla lies within Metro Cebu. It is known as the "Sugat Capital of the South". (Sugat in Cebuano means meeting.) A big event in Minglanilla is the Sugat, which attracts not people from adjacent towns as well as from Cebu city and further afield. On Black Saturday night, a public dance is held at the church plaza to witness the reenactment of the "meeting" of the risen Christ and his mother. Their images, borne on richly decorated carrozas, meet amidst joyous songs and the presence of child angels suspended by wires. The Kabanhawan (Cebuano for "Resurrection") festival is held annually on Easter Sunday.

History

Father Sanchez, Minglanilla's first parish priest, is credited as the founder of the town in 1858. The roads and bridges were built by the same Fr. Sanchez together with Fr. Magaz. There were a number of capitanes who headed the town during the Spanish era. The first capitan was Hilario Castañares. During the American regime the first was Canuto Larrobis. The first elected municipal mayor was Gregorio de la Calzada.

Buat was the former name of Minglanilla. It was the place where early settlers dried (buad/buat) their sea catches. But in 1858, it was renamed by Fr. Sanchez after a municipality called Minglanilla in Castilla–La Mancha, Spain.

The town suffered setbacks, among them during the Philippine Revolution of 1896-1898 when insurrectos burned down its municipal building and looted many houses. This event is remembered by a street named 18 de Julio (18 July). In 1942, its poblacion was razed to the ground by the Japanese in retaliation for the presence of the guerrillas in the town.

Cityhood
The Philippine Statistics Authority (PSA) highlights Minglanilla to qualify for cityhood under the population requirement of the Local Government Code. Lawyer and Mayor Rajiv Enad envisions the future city of Minglanilla after filing his candidacy as mayor of the town.

Geography

Barangays

Minglanilla comprises 19 barangays:

Climate

The climate of Minglanilla is classified as Coronas type III, characterized by a dry season lasting from one to six months. There is no pronounced maximum rain period. The town is placed within the tropical rainforest type of world climate (Köppen type: Af) which has uniform high temperature and heavy precipitation distribution throughout the year.

Demographics

Economy

Minglanilla is a part of the Cebu metropolitan area.

It is primarily a residential town, with most of its population commuting to Cebu City for work.

Prior to its suburbanization, Minglanilla's primary industry were agriculture and fishing. However, since the 2000s, when the municipality saw developments trickle down from Cebu City due to the city's own economic boom, the municipality has shifted into having a more service-driven economy.

Anjo World Theme Park is located in Barangay Calajo-an. It is the first amusement park in Cebu, and is located in the larger Belmont One development, which hosts a supermarket, a hardware, restaurants, among other retail components, also located within Barangay Calajo-an.

The Minglanilla Techno-Business Park is a  development which will be built on reclaimed land along the coast of the municipality's Tulay and Calajo-an barangays. It is envisioned primarily to host light industries, but also to other mixed-use developments as well, and is scheduled for completion by 2024.

The Cebu South Port is a is a 5 hectares expandable port development in Minglanilla, Cebu that can accommodate ocean-going Panamax Vessels. It has a 182 TEU slot container yard complemented by a fleet of handling equipment for faster receiving and releasing of containers.

Culture

Churches
Roman Catholic Parishes
Archdiocesan Shrine of the Immaculate Heart of MaryPoblacion, Minglanilla, Cebu
San Roque Parish, Linao-Lipata, Minglanilla, Cebu
Our Lady of the Holy Rosary Parish Tungkop, Minglanilla, Cebu
Parroquia de Virgen de los Remedios Guindarohan, Minglanilla, Cebu

Festivals
Sugat–Kabanhawan festivalEaster Feast of Resurrection
 In its devotion to the celebration of Christ's resurrection, the municipality of Minglanilla has long held the distinction of being the "Sugat Capital of the south". Annually held every Easter Sunday, the occasion primarily focuses on the reenactment of the meeting of the Risen Christ and the Sorrowful Mother – followed by a string of activities and events scheduled to take place throughout the day. As one of the biggest annually celebrated occasions of the municipality, the festival takes a direct translation in celebrating Christ's resurrection, with street dancing, a wide assortment of day games, and entertainment features. Essentially a socio-religious event, celebrations have played the role of host to a diverse range of organized contests, competitions, and games, including a carabao race, a Burda-making contest (Burda = embroidery), and a mud volleyball tournament. Easter-egg hunts also are part of Sugat-Kabanhawan festivals, just as the street dancing and the ritual showdown have become mainstay staples of the festival's overall program flow.

 Minglanilla Town Fiesta

Notable personalities

Morissette, singer
Golden Cañedo, singer
Deanna Wong, volleyball player
Roger Pogoy, basketball player

References

External links
 [ Philippine Standard Geographic Code]

Municipalities of Cebu
Municipalities in Metro Cebu